The South Korea national football team has appeared eleven times at the FIFA World Cup, including ten consecutive tournaments from 1986 to 2022. The team made its World Cup debut in 1954, losing both matches and finishing fourth in the group stage. South Korea's best ever result is fourth place at the 2002 tournament, co-hosted by South Korea and Japan. At the tournament, South Korea eliminated Italy and Spain in the round of 16 and quarter-finals, respectively, and thus became the first team outside Europe and the Americas to reach the semi-finals.

Competitive record

Team records

General records

World records 

Fastest goal conceded from kickoff 11 seconds, Hakan Şükür (for Turkey against South Korea), 2002
Most goals conceded, one tournament 16, Hong Deok-young, 1954
Worst goal difference, one tournament −16, South Korea, 1954
Biggest margin of loss 9, Hungary 9–0 South Korea, 1954 (joint record)
Biggest upset in the knockout stage, per FIFA rankings +34 – South Korea (ranked 40) won 2–1 over Italy (ranked 6), 2002
Biggest upset of a defending champion, per FIFA rankings +56 – South Korea (ranked 57) won 2–0 over Germany (ranked 1), 2018
Biggest upset of a top ranked team, per FIFA rankings +56 – South Korea (ranked 57) won 2–0 over Germany (ranked 1), 2018

Head-to-head record

Player records

Most appearances

Top goalscorers

Awards 

South Korea is the only Asian team to ever win a team award at a FIFA World Cup when they were voted the Most Entertaining Team in 2002 after finishing in fourth place. In the same year, Hong Myung-bo and Yoo Sang-chul were voted members of the All-star team. They are the only two Asians ever to be named in an All-star team. Hong also received the Bronze Ball award, becoming the first Asian player ever to receive the award.

Details

1954 (Switzerland) 
South Korea made their World Cup debut in 1954, becoming the second Asian team after Indonesia to ever enter the World Cup. Qualifying occurred in March 1954, barely one year after the end of the Korean War. Only South Korea and Japan competed for the Asian spot at the World Cup, and as the Koreans refused to give visas to their rivals and former colonizers, both qualifier games were held in Tokyo. With a squad that consisted entirely of army personnel, South Korea eliminated Japan with a 5–1 victory followed by a 2–2 draw.

South Korea played games against Hungary and Turkey, losing 9–0 and 7–0 respectively. Hong Deok-young became the goalkeeper to concede the most goals in a single World Cup.

1986 (Mexico) 
South Korea started the first round of the Asian qualification against Malaysia and Nepal. After qualifying for the knockout stage as group winners of the first round, South Korea beat Indonesia and Japan in the second round and the final round, respectively. They received one of the two available World Cup spots for Asian teams.

In the World Cup finals, South Korea were allocated in group A with Argentina, Bulgaria and Italy. Their first match was against Argentina, who defeated them 3–1 with Diego Maradona playing a major role. In the match, Park Chang-sun scored the first South Korean goal in the World Cup history. South Korea drew the second match 1–1 with Bulgaria in a downpour, and lost the last group match 3–2 to defending champions Italy.

1990 (Italy) 
South Korea won the Asian qualifying competition with nine victories and two draws without a defeat. However, they lost all three group matches against Belgium, Spain and Uruguay. Hwangbo Kwan scored the only tournament goal for South Korea with a long-range free kick against Spain.

1994 (United States) 

In the final round of the Asian qualification, the top two countries could advance to the 1994 FIFA World Cup, but South Korea was one point behind Japan and Saudi Arabia prior to playing the last qualifier against North Korea. South Korea couldn't qualify for the World Cup without a help of other countries. An Iraqi forward Jaffar Omran scored the equaliser in the last seconds of the match against Japan, and their match ended in a 2–2 draw. In their match, South Korea defeated North Korea 3–0, finishing with the same number of points as Japan. Conclusionally, South Korea succeeded in getting a World Cup ticket with a better goal difference than Japan, and this result was called the "Miracle of Doha" in South Korea.

At the 1994 World Cup, South Korea made tight games with Spain and Bolivia, but they were eliminated in the group stage after losing 3–2 to Germany.

1998 (France) 
South Korea's former star player Cha Bum-kun managed the national team at the 1998 FIFA World Cup. In the first half of the first match against Mexico, Ha Seok-ju scored the opening goal with a free kick, but he was sent off for an ill-advised tackle three minutes later. In the second half, South Korea failed to defend their 1–0 lead as Mexico scored three goals. They lost 5–0 to the Netherlands in the following match, and Cha was fired after the match. The assistant manager Kim Pyung-seok replaced Cha, leading a 1–1 draw with Belgium.

2002 (South Korea and Japan) 
South Korea was one of the host nations of the 2002 FIFA World Cup, along with Japan. Led by Dutch manager Guus Hiddink and his countryman Pim Verbeek, South Korean team won their first group match against Poland, achieving their first-ever World Cup victory. Afterwards, they drew 1–1 with the United States in the following match and furthermore, they defeated Portugal 1–0 in the last group match, qualifying for the knockout stage as the group winners.

In the round of 16, South Korea defeated Italy 2–1 after extra time, although there were controversial refereeing decisions including Francesco Totti's second yellow card and an offside decision against Damiano Tommasi. South Korea also defeated Spain on penalties in the quarter-finals, surpassing North Korea's result in 1966. However, their run was halted by losing 1–0 to Germany in the semi-finals. They finished fourth in the tournament after losing 3–2 to Turkey in the third place match. Team captain Hong Myung-bo won the Bronze Ball award.

2006 (Germany) 
Former manager Jo Bonfrère qualified for the 2006 FIFA World Cup, but failed to satisfy the expectations of the Korea Football Association. Dick Advocaat replaced Bonfrère to participate in the World Cup, but Advocaat secretly contracted with a Russian club Zenit Saint Petersburg just before the tournament, for which he was criticized.

Despite controversies about managers, South Korea defeated Togo 2–1 and drew 1–1 with eventual finalists France. However, they were eliminated in the group stage after losing 2–0 to Switzerland in the last match.

2010 (South Africa) 
The Korean FA appointed Hiddink's predecessor Huh Jung-moo as the manager again after Pim Verbeek resigned due to mental stress at the 2007 AFC Asian Cup. Under Huh, South Korea won their group in the final round (fourth round) of the Asian qualifiers with four victories and four draws without a loss, easily qualifying for the 2010 tournament. Park Ji-sung, Park Chu-young, Lee Chung-yong, and Ki Sung-yueng were in charge of South Korea's attack in the qualifiers, and were evaluated as four key players among the squad of the time.

South Korea finished second in the Group B with four points, qualifying for the knockout stage. They were then eliminated from the tournament after losing to Uruguay in the round of 16.

2014 (Brazil) 
Hong Myung-bo became the national team manager one year before the 2014 World Cup, and had to prepare for the competition in a short period of time. He called the bronze medalists of the 2012 Summer Olympics who had been led by him, but performed below par in the World Cup. They were pelted with yeot (a traditional Korean confectionery, which can sometimes be used to express insults) when they returned to South Korea.

2018 (Russia) 

For the combined qualification matches for the 2018 FIFA World Cup and the 2019 AFC Asian Cup, South Korea won all seven matches without conceding a goal in the second round but following a series of poor results in the third round of qualifiers, including losses to China and Qatar, the former manager Uli Stielike was sacked and was replaced by under-23 coach Shin Tae-yong for the remainder of the qualifying round. Under Shin Tae-yong, the team managed to qualify as the second-placed team in their group following two goalless draws against Iran and Uzbekistan, sending South Korea to the World Cup for the ninth consecutive time. Shin quickly tested various tactics after the qualifiers, but he had difficulty carrying out his plan due to injuries of many players. Some of them were eventually excluded from the team.

At the 2018 World Cup, they lost their first game against Sweden 1–0 after conceding from a penalty. They then faced Mexico and lost 2–1 after conceding another penalty. However, despite their two consecutive losses, South Korea was not eliminated just yet. To have any chance of advancing, South Korea would have to win their final group stage match against the defending champions Germany by at least two goals and Mexico would have to defeat Sweden in its last group stage game. South Korea for its part did what it had to do to stay in contention and won 2–0 against Germany with goals from Kim Young-gwon and Son Heung-min, causing them to be eliminated in the first round for the first time in 80 years. Germany had 28 shots with 6 on target, but the South Korea's defense, led by keeper Jo Hyeon-woo, did not concede once. However, Mexico lost to Sweden that same day and thus South Korea ultimately finished third in the group. As a result, South Korea saved Mexico from being eliminated and Mexican fans heavily praised the Koreans and celebrated their victory in front of the South Korean embassy. The match is also called the "Miracle of Kazan" in South Korea although they dropped out of the tournament.

2022 (Qatar) 
The South Korean team, led by manager Paulo Bento and captained by the reigning Premier League Golden Boot winner Son Heung-min, qualified for the World Cup as the second-placed team of the AFC qualifying group A. After a goalless draw against Uruguay and a narrow defeat against Ghana, South Korea defeated Portugal 2–1 in the final match of the group stage with a stoppage-time goal by Hwang Hee-chan. Uruguay defeated Ghana 2–0, which meant that South Korea advanced to the knockout stage for the first time since 2010 on virtue of scoring more goals than Uruguay, with the same number of points. In the round of 16, the team was eliminated after losing 4–1 to Brazil.

See also 
South Korea at the AFC Asian Cup
South Korea at the CONCACAF Gold Cup

References

External links 
 Korea Football Association official website 
 South Korea at FIFA official website

 
Korea, South